Maliattha dubiefi is a moth of the family Noctuidae. It is found in Madagascar (Massif du Tsaratanana).

References

Eustrotiinae
Moths described in 1982